Tippettville is an unincorporated community in Dooly County, in the U.S. state of Georgia.

History
The community was named after brothers Abner and Ezekiel Tippett, the proprietors of a local country store. A post office called Tippettville was established in 1891, and remained in operation until 1904.

References

Unincorporated communities in Georgia (U.S. state)
Unincorporated communities in Dooly County, Georgia